American actress Grace Kelly (1929–1982) made her screen debut in the televised play "Old Lady Robbins" (1948) on the anthology series Kraft Television Theatre. The following year, Kelly made her Broadway debut playing Bertha in The Father. In 1950, she appeared on numerous television anthology series including The Philco Television Playhouse, Studio One, The Clock, The Web, and Danger. Kelly played Helen Pettigrew in the television play "Berkeley Square" on the Prudential Family Playhouse (1951). In 1952, she portrayed Dulcinea in the drama "Don Quixote" on the anthology series CBS Television Workshop and also starred in a number of other anthology series including Hallmark Hall of Fame, Lux Video Theatre, and Suspense.

Kelly's film debut was a minor role in the 1951 drama Fourteen Hours. She followed this with an appearance in the western High Noon with Gary Cooper. For her performance as Linda Nortley in John Ford's Mogambo, she received the Golden Globe Award for Best Supporting Actress, and a nomination for the Academy Award for Best Supporting Actress. In 1954, she starred in the Alfred Hitchcock-directed thrillers Dial M for Murder with Ray Milland and Rear Window with James Stewart. In the same year, she portrayed the long-suffering wife of an alcoholic actor played by Bing Crosby in The Country Girl (1954) for which Kelly received the Academy Award for Best Actress, and the Golden Globe Award for Best Actress in a Motion Picture – Drama in 1955. She reteamed with Hitchcock on the romantic thriller To Catch a Thief (1955) with Cary Grant.

In 1956, she appeared in the romantic comedy The Swan, and the musical comedy High Society. Later that year, the 26-year-old Kelly retired from acting to marry Prince Rainier III of Monaco, becoming the princess of Monaco. In this role, she made appearances in the documentaries A Look at Monaco (1963) and Monte Carlo: C'est La Rose (1968). She was the narrator of the ballet documentary The Children of Theatre Street (1977), which was nominated for the Academy Award for Best Documentary. Kelly died in 1982 after being involved in a car crash near Monte Carlo.

She was listed 13th in the American Film Institute's 25 Greatest Female Stars of Classical Hollywood cinema in 1999 and has a star on the Hollywood Walk of Fame.

Film

Television

Stage

References

Bibliography

External links

Actress filmographies
Filmography
American filmographies